John Barton Payne (January 26, 1855January 24, 1935) was an American politician, lawyer and judge. He served as the United States Secretary of the Interior from 1920 until 1921 under Woodrow Wilson's administration.

Early life and career

Payne was born on January 26, 1855, in Pruntytown, West Virginia, the son of Amos Payne, who was a doctor and farmer, and the former Elizabeth Barton.

Admitted to the bar in 1876 in West Virginia, Payne entered politics five years later as the chairman of the Preston County Democratic Party.  He moved to Chicago, Illinois, in 1883, and was elected in 1893 to the Superior Court of Cook County, which he served on until resigning from that post in 1898. After resigning his judgeship, Payne was the senior partner in Winston, Payne, Strawn and Shaw. A successor firm, Winston & Strawn, still exists. He was the president of the Chicago's South Park Board from 1911 to 1924.

In 1913 he declined an offer from president Woodrow Wilson to serve as solicitor general of the United States.

After the outbreak of World War I, Payne went to Washington, D.C., to act as the counsel for the Emergency Fleet Corporation and was the general counsel of the United States Railroad Administration Feb. 1918-Aug. 1919. From 1919 through his appointment to Wilson's cabinet in February 1920, Payne served as the Chairman of the U.S. Shipping Board.

From October 1921 until his death, Payne served as the Chairman of the American Red Cross. In May 1921, Payne pledged funds for the permanent structure for the Warrenton Library in Fauquier County, Virginia.

Payne was a founder of the Virginia Museum of Fine Arts in Richmond in 1911, and he donated 50 paintings to the museum in 1919. Some of his personal papers were given to the Special Collections Research Center at the College of William & Mary.

Personal life
Payne married Kate Bunker on October 17, 1878.  She died after a long illness. Payne married his second wife, the former Jennie Byrd Bryan (daughter of the late Thomas Barbour Bryan), on May 1, 1913.  Jennie Payne died in 1919, and he remained a widower in office.

He died of pneumonia after an operation for appendicitis on January 24, 1935, at the age of 79. Two days later, an Associated Press obituary ran in the Chicago Tribune.  Payne was buried in Oak Hill Cemetery in Washington, D.C., next to his second wife.

Sources
 John B. Payne, Ex-Member of the Cabinet, Dead, Chicago Tribune, p. 1, Jan. 24, 1935
 American Red Cross website
 Fauquier County Public Library - Library History

References

External links

 American President.org - Secretary of the Interior: John B. Payne (1920 - 1921)
 Fauquier County Public Library - Library History
 International Red Cross and Red Crescent Movement History - John Barton Payne 1922-35
 Finding aid for the John Barton Payne Papers
 William & Mary Libraries Special Collections Research Center - John Barton Payne Papers 

 
 
 

1855 births
1935 deaths
People from Taylor County, West Virginia
Presidents of the International Federation of Red Cross and Red Crescent Societies
American Red Cross personnel
United States Secretaries of the Interior
West Virginia Democrats
Illinois Democrats
Lawyers from Chicago
West Virginia lawyers
American art collectors
Woodrow Wilson administration cabinet members
20th-century American politicians
Deaths from pneumonia in Washington, D.C.
Judges of the Superior Court of Cook County
Burials at Oak Hill Cemetery (Washington, D.C.)
People from Preston County, West Virginia
Deaths from appendicitis